Obryte  is a village in Pułtusk County, Masovian Voivodeship, in east-central Poland. It is the seat of the gmina (administrative district) called Gmina Obryte.

The village has an approximate population of 930.

References

Villages in Pułtusk County